1000 Crore Club is an unofficial designation by the Indian film trade and the media, related to Indian language films that have grossed ₹1000 crore (10 billion Indian rupees or ) or more in India or worldwide. The 1000 crore club is preceded by the 100 crore club. Baahubali 2: The Conclusion (2017) became the first Indian film to gross over ₹1000 crore worldwide. It was followed by the Aamir Khan-starrer Hindi film Dangal, which is the highest-grossing Indian film, expanding the club to 1700 crore, 1800 crore and 1900 crore, before creating the  club, and becoming the fifth highest-grossing non-English language film of all time. In 2022, two films released in the span of a month, RRR and K.G.F: Chapter 2, have also grossed more than ₹1,000 crore at the global box office . In 2023, another Hindi film Pathaan has also grossed more than 1,020 crores at the global box office.

History
Baahubali 2 is the highest-grossing film in India, where it has grossed . Overseas, it is the highest-grossing Indian film in the United States ($21 million), where it became the first Indian film to cross $20 million, as well as becoming the first Indian film to gross over $10 million in the United Arab Emirates.

Dangal (2016), following its Chinese release on 5 May 2017, became the highest-grossing Indian film and fifth highest-grossing non-English language film of all time, crossing  worldwide, making it the first Indian film to gross $300 million worldwide and one of the top 30 highest-grossing 2016 films (surpassing the $299.5 million gross of Alice Through the Looking Glass). Dangal is also the highest-grossing sports film of 2017, and Disney's fourth highest-grossing film of 2017.

Its overseas gross in China more than doubled its domestic gross of $84.4 million in India. In China, Dangal became the 16th highest-grossing film of all time, the 8th highest-grossing foreign film, the highest-grossing non-Hollywood foreign film (surpassing Japanese anime film Your Name), the leggiest box office release (cumulative gross 83 times its opening day haul, surpassing Zootopia), had the most consecutive days with a ¥10 million (US$ million) gross (surpassing the 30 days of Transformers: Age of Extinction) and $1 million gross (38 days), was the highest-grossing film in May 2017 (ahead of Pirates of the Caribbean: Dead Men Tell No Tales and Guardians of the Galaxy Vol. 2), and is the year's second highest-grossing foreign film (after The Fate of the Furious). In 47 days, the film had 44,445,270 admissions at the Chinese box office. Aamir Khan's earnings from Dangal is estimated to be , the highest payday for a non-Hollywood actor.

List

This is a list of the films in the 1000 crore club, adjusted for inflation. For the list of the highest-grossing Indian films in terms of nominal value (without adjusted inflation), see List of highest-grossing Indian films.

Milestones
See 100 Crore Club for milestones between ₹100 crore and ₹1000 crore

Worldwide

Domestic

Overseas

See also

 100 Crore Club
 List of highest-grossing Indian films
 List of highest-grossing Hindi films
 List of highest-grossing South Indian films
 List of highest-grossing films in India
 List of highest-grossing Indian films in overseas markets
 List of highest-grossing films in China
 List of Soviet films of the year by ticket sales
 List of most expensive Indian films

Notes

References

Kannada cinema
Telugu cinema
Hindi cinema
Neologisms
Film and video terminology